Barog railway station is a small railway station in the Solan district in the Indian state of Himachal Pradesh. The station lies on UNESCO World Heritage Site Kalka–Shimla Railway.

It has allotted the railway code of BOF under the jurisdiction of Ambala railway division.

The line was later regauged to -wide narrow gauge.

Major trains 

 Kalka Shimla NG Passenger
 Kalka Shimla Rail Motor
 Shivalik Deluxe Express
 Himalayan Queen
 Shimla Kalka Passenger

See also
 Solan railway station
 Shimla railway station
 Kalka railway station
 Chandigarh Junction railway station

References

Railway stations in Solan district
Ambala railway division
Railway stations opened in 1903
Mountain railways in India

British-era buildings in Himachal Pradesh